Senator Girdler may refer to:

Chris Girdler (born 1979), Kentucky State Senate
Rick Girdler (born 1955), Kentucky State Senate